Barocco is a 1925 French silent adventure film directed by Charles Burguet and starring Nilda Duplessy, Jean Angelo, and Charles Vanel.

Cast
 Nilda Duplessy as Gisèle 
 Jean Angelo as Jean de Kerauden 
 Charles Vanel as Barocco 
 Suzy Vernon as Enid Hanseley 
 Camille Bardou as Le professeur Latouche 
 Maurice Luguet as Aucagne 
 Paul Franceschi as Gunther 
 Berthe Jalabert as Georgina 
 Labusquière as Un chacouch 
 Charles Burguet as M. Hanseley

References

Bibliography
 Parish, James Robert. Film Actors Guide. Scarecrow Press, 1977.

External links

1925 films
Films directed by Charles Burguet
French silent feature films
French adventure films
1925 adventure films
French black-and-white films
Silent adventure films
1920s French films